A switcheroo is a sudden unexpected variation or reversal, often for a humorous purpose.

Switcheroo may also refer to:

Switcheroo, a 1998 novel by Olivia Goldsmith
Switcheroo, a 2016 novel by Aaron Elkins
"Switcheroo", a pricing game from The Price Is Right TV series
"Switcheroo", an episode of American Dragon: Jake Long TV series
"Switcheroo (Space Ghost Coast to Coast)", an episode of Space Ghost Coast to Coast
"Switcheroo", a 2012 episode of This American Life radio program
"Switcheroo", track on the 2000 Superfast (Dynamite Hack album)

See also 
 
Comic strip switcheroo, a 1997 April Fools' Day practical joke 
The Switcheroo Series: Alexisonfire vs. Moneen, a 2005 EP by bands Alexisonfire and Moneen
"The Great Switcheroo", a short story by Roald Dahl Katie Kazoo, Switcheroo'', a book series by Nancy E. Krulik